The Danger Line (also known as The Battle) is a 1924 American silent film directed by  and featuring Sessue Hayakawa, Tsuru Aoki, Gina Palerme and Francis Ward (Félix Ford) in pivotal roles. It was produced by Robertson-Cole Pictures Corporation and premiered in USA on May 26, 1924. The American Film Institute Catalog of Motion Pictures Produced in the United States lists it under Americanization.

References

External links 

 

American silent feature films
American black-and-white films
1924 films
Film Booking Offices of America films
1920s American films